Amalia Sartori (born 2 August 1947 in Valdastico) is an Italian politician.

Education
  Graduate in literature

Career
 1971-1985: Teacher
 1985-1990: Member of the Regional Executive of the Veneto with responsibility for roads and transport
 1986-1987: Chairman of the international airport of Venice
 1988-1989: Chairman of the Veneto, Emilia Romagna and Piemonte inter-regional board for the management of the Po river - Veneto water-ways system
 1990-1993: Vice-chairman of the Regional Executive of the Veneto
 1995-2000: Chairman of the Regional Council
 Drew up the first Regional Transport Plan for the Veneto, the 'Snow Plan' and the Plan for tourist ports
 Launched the special Plan for 'black spots' and important safety campaigns
 Has been responsible for major institutional initiatives upholding the interests of women in the institutional, family and social spheres
 1999-2014: Member of the European Parliament

See also
2004 European Parliament election in Italy

External links
 
 

1947 births
Living people
Forza Italia MEPs
The People of Freedom MEPs
MEPs for Italy 1999–2004
MEPs for Italy 2004–2009
MEPs for Italy 2009–2014
20th-century women MEPs for Italy
21st-century women MEPs for Italy
Presidents of the regional council of Veneto